Fiore "Jimmy" Casella (June 3, 1924 – August 10, 1976) was a prominent poker player at the World Series of Poker in the 1970s.

In the 1971 World Series of Poker, he won the Limit Razz event, but he found his greatest success in the 1974 World Series of Poker, where he won the Seven Card Razz and the Seven-Card Stud world championship. For winning these three events, he won $76,225.

After the 1974 World Series of Poker, he did not have another cash in a poker tournament. He died of a drug overdose on August 10, 1976.

Casella was the uncle of Elizabeth Beckwith (a writer, actress, and comic) and Christian philosopher Dr. Francis J. Beckwith, whose father is the brother of Jimmy's first wife, Doris. Casella is mentioned in Dr. Beckwith's book, Return to Rome: Confessions of An Evangelical Catholic (Brazos Press, 2008)

World Series of Poker bracelets

References

American poker players
World Series of Poker bracelet winners
1924 births
1976 deaths
American gamblers